Riopa anguina is a species of skink found in Myanmar and Thailand.

References

Riopa
Reptiles described in 1868
Taxa named by William Theobald
Taxobox binomials not recognized by IUCN